The Detroit Titans track and field team is men's and women's track and field team that represents the University of Detroit Mercy in the NCAA Division I and competes in the Horizon League. The team is coached by head coach Guy Murray and assistant coaches Rondell Ruff and Curtis Bell.

Top 10 List 
Updated to end of 2022-23 indoor season.

60 Meter Dash 

Men's 60 Meter Dash

Women's 60 Meter Dash

100 Meter Dash

Men's 100 Meter Dash

Women's 100 Meter Dash

200 Meter Dash 

Men's 200 Meter Dash

Women's 200 Meter Dash

400 Meter Dash 

Men's 400 Meter Dash

Women's 400 Meter Dash

800 Meter Run 

Men's 800 Meter Run

Women's 800 Meter Run

1500 Meter Run 

Men's 1500 Meter Run

Women's 1500 Meter Run

Mile Run 

Men's Mile Run

Women's Mile Run

3000 Meter Run 

Men's 3000 Meter Run

Women's 3000 Meter Run

5000 Meter Run 

Men's 5000 Meter Run

Women's 5000 Meter Run

10000 Meter Run 

Men's 10000 Meter Run

Women's 10000 Meter Run

60 Meter Hurdles 

Men's 60 Meter Hurdles

Women's 60 Meter Hurdles

100/110 Meter Hurdles 

Men's 110 Meter Hurdles

Women's 100 Meter Hurdles

400 Meter Hurdles 

Men's 400 Meter Hurdles

Women's 400 Meter Hurdles

3000 Meter Steeplechase 

Men's 3000 Meter Steeplechase

Women's 3000 Meter Steeplechase

4x100 Meter Relay 

Men's 4x100 Meter Relay

Women's 4x100 Meter Relay

4x400 Meter Relay 

Men's 4x400 Meter Relay

Women's 4x400 Meter Relay

Distance Medley Relay 

Men's Distance Medley Relay

Women's Distance Medley Relay

High Jump 

Men's High Jump

Women's High Jump

Pole Vault 

Men's Pole Vault

Women's Pole Vault

Long Jump 

Men's Long Jump

Women's Long Jump

Triple Jump 

Men's Triple Jump

Women's Triple Jump

Shot Put 

Men's Shot Put

Women's Shot Put

Discus 

Men's Discus

Women's Discus

Hammer Throw 

Men's Hammer Throw

Women's Hammer Throw

Javelin 

Men's Javelin

Old Implement

Women's Javelin

Weight Throw 

Men's Weight Throw

Women's Weight Throw

Indoor Combined Events 

Men's Heptathlon

Women's Pentathlon

Outdoor Combined Events 

Men's Decathlon

Women's Heptathlon

All-Americans 
Outdoor track

References 

University of Detroit Mercy, 2009 Titan Track and Field Media Guide
Detroit Titans
Track & Field Results Reporting System

College track and field teams in the United States
Tra